Isabelle "Isa" Ljunggren Molin, born 1992, is a Swedish singer and songwriter.

With a songwriting dad Bobby Ljunggren, Molin has been surrounded by music all her life. She has collaborated with songwriters all over the world and has already managed to create a song collection, securing cuts by Steps, Clara Klingenström, Anna Bergendahl, Jill Johnson, Doug Seegers, Robin Stjernberg, Klara Hammarström,  among others.

Molin participated in Melodifestivalen 2019 with the song "Torn", performed by Lisa Ajax, which was the only entry in the selection composed by a single songwriter. The song finished in 9th place in the final.

In 2022, Molin participated in Melodifestivalen again with the song "Hold Me Closer", which she co-wrote with David Zandèn and Cornelia Jakobs. The song won the selection and thus represented Sweden in the Eurovision Song Contest 2022 in Turin and finished in 4th place with 438 points.

References

1992 births
Living people
Swedish songwriters